"Waiting at the Church" is a popular British music hall song written by Fred W. Leigh (words) and Henry E. Pether (music) for Vesta Victoria, and copyrighted in 1906. 

It is sung by a bride-to-be who has given her fiancé, Obadiah Binks, all her money to buy a ring or a house, only to be left "waiting at the church"; she finds out the truth when Obadiah sends her a note telling her he is already married.  It has featured in a number of films since the earliest days of cinema.   The silent film Waiting at the Church featured a performance by Victoria as she acted out the lyrics. Several other silent films were made to accompany recordings of the song.   Sound films which use the song include Here Come the Huggetts, Millions Like Us and I Thank You. Richard Thompson included it on his album 1000 Years of Popular Music. It has also been covered many times, including by Julie Andrews and Miss Piggy.

The song became famed in British politics when the second half of its refrain was sung by the then Prime Minister James Callaghan at the Annual Congress of the TUC in September 1978, to indicate that there would not be a general election that year. Callaghan misattributed the song to the better-known Marie Lloyd, an error which has in consequence become common.

References

Music hall songs
British songs
1906 songs
James Callaghan
1978 in British politics
The Muppets songs
Richard Thompson (musician) songs
Songs with lyrics by Fred W. Leigh